"The Shake" is the third single released from Australian rock band Kisschasy's debut album, United Paper People (2005). It was released on 27 February 2006 and charted at  25 in Australia.

Track listing

Charts

References

2006 singles
2006 songs
Kisschasy songs
Kisschasy video albums
Song recordings produced by Phil McKellar